Windley is a surname. Notable people with this surname include:

 Bill Windley (1868–1953), Australian rules footballer
 Callum Windley (born 1990), British rugby player
 Carol Windley (born 1947), Canadian short story writer and novelist
 Chris Windley, drummer of the band Dallas Frasca
 Edward Henry Windley (1909–1972), British governor of the Gambia
 Jade Windley (born 1990), British tennis player

English-language surnames